Shaista Jabeen is a Pakistani television actress. She appeared in PTV's classic serials in 1990s. She started acting in television around 1993–94 and has acted in more than 50 serials. Her notable TV dramas are Dasht, Aaghosh , Duniya Dari, Beti and many others.

Early life
Jabeen was born on June 29, 1964 in Quetta, Baluchistan.

Acting career
Jabeen started her acting career in stage dramas during the 1980s. Then she was cast in Pakistan television dramas. Initially she performed in small supportive roles. She got her first breakthrough as a TV actress in drama "Dasht" (1993). Drama "Aaghosh" from PTV (1991) made her a notable TV actress.

Personal life
Jabeen chose to be a never-married woman.

Selected television work

References

External links

Living people
21st-century Pakistani actresses
Pakistan Television Corporation people
1968 births